Calcinato is a comune in the province of Brescia, in Lombardy.  It is bounded by other communes of Mazzano, Lonato and Bedizzole.

Twin towns
Calcinato is twinned with:

  Champtoceaux, France

Transport
 Ponte San Marco-Calcinato railway station

References

Cities and towns in Lombardy
Municipalities of the Province of Brescia